Nestor Mendez (born January 21, 1971) is a Belizean diplomat and politician. He is currently the Assistant Secretary General of the Organization of American States.

Biography
Nestor Mendez was elected as the ninth Assistant Secretary General of the Organization of American States (OAS) on March 18, 2015. He began serving his five-year term on July 13, 2015, and on March 20, 2020, was unanimously re-elected by the General Assembly to serve a second five-year term.

As Secretary to the Permanent Council and its subsidiary bodies, Ambassador Mendez is central to its deliberations and to the core work of the General Secretariat.   In working to address the issues confronting the hemisphere, he has given priority attention to climate change and natural disasters, advocated for women's rights and gender equality, and has brought renewed focus to the plight of marginalized and vulnerable groups.  He has also been at the forefront of promoting innovation, competitiveness, and entrepreneurship as avenues for unearthing leadership and talent, and for empowering the youth of the Americas. 

Upon receiving the mandate from member states, he pledged his “unwavering commitment to seize the opportunity that is before us to work together to transform the OAS into the Organization that we want and that the people of the Americas deserve.”

Assistant Secretary General Mendez has worked closely with the Secretary General and Member States towards the revitalization and modernization of the institution, in advancing its role and relevance in the hemisphere, in fostering partnerships for development, and strengthening regional inter-connectivity.   He remains driven to build upon the work which he has started, and fully committed to expanding on the progress achieved “in positioning the OAS to deliver enduring security, lasting peace, progress and development for the Hemisphere.”

Prior to his election, Nestor Mendez was a career diplomat in the Foreign Service of Belize. He served as the ambassador to the United States of America, Permanent Representative to the OAS, and Non-Resident High Commissioner to Canada.

Ambassador
As Ambassador of Belize to the United States, Mendez traveled throughout the country to engage with the Belizean diaspora and to meet with prospective investors and companies interested in investing in Belize. He also focused on a wide range of development issues pertaining to the Caribbean and Central America such as alternative sources of energy, micro, small and medium-sized enterprises, trade and investment promotion, and security.

During Mendez's tenure as Permanent Representative of Belize to the Organization of American States, Ambassador Mendez chaired several Councils and Committees of the organization including the Permanent Council, the Committee on Hemispheric Security, the Special Committee for Migration Issues, and the Inter-American Council for Integral Development (CIDI) where he focused on matters related to innovation, competitiveness, and supporting micro, small and medium-sized enterprises as engines for economic growth and development. As Chair of the Organization of American States Permanent Council, he used this platform to focus attention on climate change and introduced several institutional initiatives to increase awareness of the impact of this phenomenon, especially on the smaller and more vulnerable states.

Ambassador Mendez previously held diplomatic posts at the High Commission for Belize in London, United Kingdom, where he served as counsellor, and at the Embassy of Belize in Guatemala, where served as first secretary.

Education  
Mendez holds a master's degree in international policy and practice from George Washington University in Washington, D.C., a graduate-level certificate in diplomatic studies from Oxford University in Oxford, United Kingdom, and a bachelor's degree in business administration from the University College of Belize in Belize City, Belize.

Mendez is married and has two children.

References

External links
 Organization of American States

Organization of American States people
Living people
Belizean diplomats
1971 births
Ambassadors of Belize to the United States
Permanent Representatives of Belize to the Organization of American States
High Commissioners of Belize to Canada
George Washington University alumni
Alumni of the University of Oxford
University of Belize alumni